Halstead Clotworthy Fowler (19 April 18897 September 1950) was a colonel in the United States Army. He commanded the 71st Field Artillery during the Philippines campaign (1941–1942) and was multiply decorated. He was a survivor of the Bataan Death March and prisoner of war.

Early life
Halstead Fowler was born in 1899 in Brooklyn, New York to Halstead Parker Fowler and Carrie Haines Fowler. His father was an architect and a captain in the New York National Guard. After his father died, he moved to Charleston, South Carolina where he attended high school and the College of Charleston for one year before transferring to  West Point in 1918, graduating in 1920.

Early military career
Fowler spent two and a half years in the 61st Antiaircraft Battalion at Fort Monroe before being sent to the Philippines in 1923. He returned to Fort Sill in the United States and transferred to the field artillery at  Fort Benjamin Harrison. He attended the Command and General Staff School at Fort Leavenworth and then was an Assistant Professor of Military Science and Tactics at Ohio State University.

Invasion of the Philippines
Fowler returned to the Philippines in October 1941 as a major and soon thereafter a lieutenant colonel, commanding the 71st Field Artillery of the Philippine Army. Fowler's unit fought a delaying action after the Japanese invasion of Lingayen Gulf and retreated south to the Bataan peninsula. For his actions at the Agno River, Luzon in December 1941 and northern Bataan in January 1942, he was awarded the Distinguished Service Cross twice.

He was wounded three times in four weeks between December 1941 and January 1942 and then captured after the surrender.

Prisoner of War
Fowler survived the Bataan Death March and was held prisoner at the Bilibid prisoner of war camp. He never fully recovered from his wounds and loss of eyesight during captivity and retired as a colonel on 30 September 1946.

Later life
Fowler had married Margaret "Tykie" Adams, the daughter of Brigadier General William K. Naylor and mother of Fowler's three stepchildren, in 1938. After his retirement, they lived on a farm in Afton, Virginia and he died there on 7 September 1950. He was buried at Arlington National Cemetery on 11 September 1950.

See also
71st Division (Philippines)
Alva R. Fitch

References

Further reading

1889 births
1950 deaths
People from Brooklyn
College of Charleston alumni
United States Military Academy alumni
Military personnel from Charleston, South Carolina
United States Army Command and General Staff College alumni
Ohio State University faculty
United States Army personnel of World War II
Recipients of the Silver Star
Recipients of the Distinguished Service Cross (United States)
Bataan Death March prisoners
American prisoners of war in World War II
World War II prisoners of war held by Japan
United States Army colonels
People from Afton, Virginia
Burials at Arlington National Cemetery